A constitutional referendum was held in Spanish Guinea on 11 August 1968, in order to prepare the country for independence from Francoist Spain. The new constitution would create a presidential republic with a 35-seat unicameral parliament, and was supported by 64.32% of voters with a turnout of 91.7%. Elections were held according to the new constitution in September.

In a 1963 referendum voters had voted in favor of autonomy from Spain.

Results

References

Spanisg Guinea
Referendums in Equatorial Guinea
1968 in Equatorial Guinea
Constitutional referendums in Equatorial Guinea